Andriy Valeriyovych Nelin (born 17 July 1991) is a professional Ukrainian football defender playing in for FC Viktoriya Mykolaivka.

External links 

Profile on Official Dnipro Website

1991 births
Living people
Sportspeople from Sumy
Ukrainian footballers
FC Illichivets-2 Mariupol players
FC Zhemchuzhyna Yalta players
FC Hirnyk-Sport Horishni Plavni players
FC Viktoriya Mykolaivka players
Association football defenders